The , or JAMSTEC (海洋機構), is a Japanese national research institute for marine-earth science and technology. It was founded as Japan Marine Science and Technology Center (海洋科学技術センター) in October 1971, and became an Independent Administrative Institution administered by the Ministry of Education, Culture, Sports, Science and Technology (MEXT) in April 2004.

Projects

International projects
 The Array for Real Time Geostrophic Oceanography (ARGO)
 The Climate Variability and Predictability Programme (CLIVAR)
 Global Earth Observation System of Systems (GEOSS)
 Global Ocean Observing System (GOOS)
 International Continental Scientific Drilling Program (ICDP)
 The International Margins Program (InterMARGINS)
 An initiative for international cooperation in ridge-crest studies (InterRidge)
 Integrated Ocean Drilling Program (IODP)
 North Pacific Marine Science Organization (PICES)

Organization

JAMSTEC is organized into three sections: Research, Development and Promotion, and Management.

Research
 Research Institute for Global Change (RIGC)
 Ocean Climate Change Research Program
 Tropical Climate Variability Research Program
 Northern Hemisphere Cryosphere Program
 Environmental Biogeochemical Cycle Research Program
 Global Change Projection Research Program
 Climate Variation Predictability and Applicability Research Program
 Advanced Atmosphere-Ocean-Land Modeling Program
 Institute for Research on Earth Evolution (IFREE)
 Plate Dynamics Research Program
 Solid Earth Dynamics Research Program
 Deep Earth Dynamics Research Program
 Geochemical Evolution Research Program
 Institute of Biogeosciences (Biogeos)
 Marine Biodiversity Research Program
 Extremobiosphere Research Program
 Earth and Life History Research Program
 Leading Project
 Earthquake and Tsunami Research Project for Disaster Prevention
 Global Warming Research Project for IPCC – AR5
 Submarine Resources Research Project
 Laboratory System
 Laboratory for Earth Systems Science
 Precambrian Ecosystem Laboratory Unit
 Space and Earth System Modeling Research Lab. Unit
 Application Laboratory
 Climate Variations Research Laboratory Unit
 Mutsu Institute for Oceanography (MIO)
 Research Group
 Research Promotion Group
 General Affairs Division, MIO
 Kochi Institute for Core Sample Research (KOCHI)
 Research Group
 Science Services Group
 General Affairs Division, KOCHI
 Research Support Department
 Research Support Division I
 Research Support Division II

Development and promotion
 Marine Technology and Engineering Center (MARITEC)
 Planning and Coordination Group
 Marine Technology Development Department
 Research Fleet Department
 Research Vessel Construction Department
 Earth Simulator Center (ESC)
 Information Systems Department
 Advanced Simulation and Technology Development Program
 Simulation Application Research and Development Program
 Data Research Center for Marine-Earth Sciences (DrC)
 Data Management and Engineering Department (DMED)
 Global Oceanographic Data Center (GODAC)
 Center for Deep Earth Exploration (CDEX)
 Planning and Coordination Department, CDEX
 Operations Department
 Technology Development Group
 Science Promotion Group
 HSE Group
 Advanced Research and Technology Promotion Department
 Research Advancement Division
 International Affairs Division
 Public Relations Division
 Library Division
 Observing System Research and Technological Development Laboratory
 Southern Ocean Buoy Laboratory Unit
 Autonomous Profiling Shuttle Development Laboratory Unit

Management
 Planning Department
 Planning Division
 Technology Planning Office
 Press Office
 Administration Department
 Administration Division
 Personnel Division
 Facility Management Division
 Employee Support Division
 YES General Affairs Division
 Tokyo Office
 Legal Affairs Office
 Finance and Contracts Department
 Finance and Accounting Division
 Accounting Division
 Contracts Division I
 Contracts Division II
 Safety and Environment Management Office
 Audit Office

Equipment

JAMSTEC currently owns the following vessels and vehicles for marine research:
 Research Vessels: Natsushima, Kaiyo, Hakuho Maru, Tansei Maru
 Support Vessel: Yokosuka
 Manned Research Deep Submergence Vehicles: DSV Shinkai 2000 and Shinkai 6500
 Oceanographic Research Vessel : RV Mirai
 Research Vessel: Kaimei
 Deep Sea Drilling Vessel: Chikyū
 Deep Sea Cruising Autonomous Underwater Vehicle: Urashima
 Remotely Operated Vehicles: Hyper-Dolphin, Kaikō 7000II, and REMUS 6000
 Deep Ocean Floor Survey System: Deep Tow

Facilities

JAMSTEC is headquartered in Yokosuka and based in five other locations: 
 Yokohama Institute for Earth Sciences (YES) in Yokohama.
 Mutsu Institute for Oceanography (MIO) in Mutsu, Aomori.
 Kochi Institute for Core Sample Research (KOCHI) in Kōchi.
 Global Oceanographic Data Center (GODAC) in Nago, Okinawa.
 Tokyo Office.

See also
Intergovernmental Oceanographic Commission (UNESCO)
Taiwan Ocean Research Institute

References

External links
 
 
T-Limit Expedition

 
Research institutes in Japan
Earth sciences organizations
Oceanographic organizations
Independent Administrative Institutions of Japan
Scientific organizations based in Japan
Yokosuka, Kanagawa
Scientific organizations established in 1971
1971 establishments in Japan